Mark de Berg is a Dutch computational geometer, known as one of the authors of the textbook Computational Geometry: Algorithms and Applications (with Otfried Cheong, Marc van Kreveld, and Mark Overmars, Springer, 1997; 3rd ed., 2008).

De Berg completed his Ph.D. in 1992 at Utrecht University. His dissertation, Efficient Algorithms for Ray Shooting and Hidden Surface Removal, was supervised by Mark Overmars.
He is a professor of computer science at the Eindhoven University of Technology.

With David Mount, de Berg was co-chair of the 2003 Symposium on Computational Geometry.

References

External links
Home page

Year of birth missing (living people)
Living people
Dutch computer scientists
Researchers in geometric algorithms
Utrecht University alumni
Academic staff of the Eindhoven University of Technology